Latics is a short form of the suffix Athletic. As such, it refers to two English football clubs:

 Oldham Athletic A.F.C. in the National League
 Wigan Athletic F.C. in the Football League Championship